Mount Hood Avenue station is a light rail station on the MAX Red Line in Portland, Oregon. Located at the northern end of the Cascade Station development, it is the 2nd stop north on the Airport MAX. Mount Hood is approximately 40 miles (64.3 km) away from the station.

External links
Station information (with southbound/eastbound ID number) from TriMet
Station information (with northbound/westbound ID number) from TriMet
MAX Light Rail Stations – more general TriMet page

MAX Light Rail stations
MAX Red Line
Railway stations in the United States opened in 2001
2001 establishments in Oregon
Railway stations in Portland, Oregon